The Great Conqueror's Concubine, alternatively known as King of Western Chu, is a Hong Kong historical drama film directed by Stephen Shin and Wei Handao, starring Ray Lui, Rosamund Kwan, Zhang Fengyi and Gong Li. The film is based on the events in the Chu–Han Contention, an interregnum between the fall of the Qin dynasty and the founding of the Han dynasty.

Cast
 Ray Lui as Xiang Yu
 Rosamund Kwan as Consort Yu
 Zhang Fengyi as Liu Bang
 Gong Li as Lü Zhi
 Chin Shih-chieh as Zhang Liang
 To Siu-chun as Xiao He
 Lau Shun as Fan Zeng
 Wu Hsing-kuo as Yu Ziqi
 Hsu Chan as Qin Shi Huang
 Chang Shih as Qin Er Shi
 Chen Sung-young as Fan Kuai
 Yeh Chuan-chen as Liu Bang's servant
 Yu Hai as Xiang Liang
 Jin Demao as Xiang Bo
 Xu Xiangdong as Xiang Zhuang
 Elvis Tsui as Zhongli Mo
 Kwan Hoi-san as Zhao Gao
 Yang Fan as Tian Rong
 Ku Pao-ming as King Huai II of Chu
 Xu Guanglin as Cao Shen
 Xue Liang as Ziying
 Li Yanping as Eunuch
 Nige Mutu as Wang Li
 Zhang Lihua as Ying Bu
 Zhang Xuehao as Zhang Han
 Liu Hen as Liu Taigong
 Han Xiuli as Liu Bang's grandmother

See also
 List of Asian historical drama films

External links
 
 

1994 films
Hong Kong historical drama films
Chinese historical drama films
Films set in the Chu–Han Contention
Films set in the Qin dynasty
1990s historical films
1990s Hong Kong films